The N5 road is a national primary road in Ireland, connecting Longford town with Westport. It is the main access route from Dublin (via the M4/N4) to most of County Mayo, including the county's largest towns, Castlebar, Ballina (via the N26), and Westport.

Almost all of the route has been improved during the 2000s with the construction of bypasses and extensive resurfacing works on stretches not bypassed. From Longford, the N5 passes through Strokestown and close to Ballaghaderreen, before crossing the N17 at an interchange near Ireland West Airport Knock. The N26 to Ballina leaves the N5 just outside Swinford.

Standard of route
The N5 is a two-lane, single carriageway route throughout its entire length. The remainder of the route – between Frenchpark and Strokestown and between Westport and Castlebar – consists of a narrow road with no hard shoulders, and with a poor horizontal and vertical alignment allowing few overtaking opportunities.

Almost all of the route has a modern asphalt surface laid after the year 2000. This is largely in good condition, except for a stretch of several kilometres just west of Tulsk, where the road pavement has degraded significantly.

Campaign to upgrade route
The standard of the N5 road is a significant political issue in Mayo. Local politicians have argued that because the N5 is the main access route to the county, it should be upgraded to a consistent standard - a single carriageway road with hard shoulders, bypassing all towns along the route.

Political arguments were given more weight in recent years when several major multinational firms based in Mayo joined forces to lobby the government to upgrade the N5. The Mayo Industries Group is made up of household names including Coca-Cola (through its Mayo subsidiary Ballina Beverages), Allergan Pharmaceuticals, Baxter and Hollister. The group has met with senior government ministers on several occasions in an attempt to secure funding for further improvements to the road.

Completed schemes

Ballaghaderreen bypass
This scheme comprises  of standard single carriageway and provides a bypass to the north of Ballaghaderreen town. The project includes realignment/bridging of local roads and a major grade separated junction between the N5 and R293 to provide access to the town. An Bord Pleanála approved the scheme in 2008. Transport Minister Leo Varadkar turned the first sod on the project on 2 November 2012, and the road opened on 2 September 2014.

Longford bypass
This is a  standard single carriageway link between the N4 and the existing N5. It provides a bypass to the northwest of Longford town so that traffic between Dublin and Mayo no longer has to pass through Longford town centre. The scheme includes rail and river bridge crossings and access is restricted to the roundabouts at either end of the scheme. Construction commenced in April 2011 and the road opened to traffic on 3 August 2012.

Charlestown bypass
It cost €81 million to build.

It is named the John Healy Road in honour of the late Irish Times journalist who wrote about the economic decline of Charlestown in the 1960s.

Scramoge – Cloonmore
An  stretch of standard single carriageway between Strokestown and Longford commenced construction in September 2001 and was officially opened on 10 May 2004 at a cost of €21 million. The project includes two river bridges, one rail bridge, 500 metres of culverts and 600,000 cubic metres of earthworks - including excavation of 350,000 cubic metres of peat.

Swinford bypass
A  single carriageway bypass of Swinford was completed in 1993. It incorporates a major junction with the N26 road to Ballina.

Castlebar – Turlough
This  single carriageway includes a bypass of Turlough village and a relief road around Castlebar. It opened in 1990.

Schemes in planning or construction

Westport – Turlough (under construction)
This  project will comprise a new 20km dual carriageway from Westport to the existing N5 near Turlough, bypassing Castlebar, as well as a single carriageway relief road around Westport and the realignment of 2.5km of the N59 road north of the town. An Bórd Pleanala approved the route in May 2014. Contracts were signed in October 2019 for the construction of the project. It is due to be completed in late 2022.

Scramoge – Ballaghaderreen
The project involves the upgrade of the N5 in Co Roscommon between Rathkeery at the eastern end of the Ballaghaderreen bypass and Scramoge, east of Strokestown. It will bypass Frenchpark, Bellanagare, Tulsk and Strokestown. The planned route, a  stretch of single carriageway, was approved by An Bord Pleanala in January 2019. Contracts for the construction of the project were signed in October 2021, with work due to start in early 2022.

Turlough – Bohola
The Turlough to Bohola road scheme will facilitate the upgrade of the N5 from east of Castlebar to east of Bohola. The project will combine an online upgrade of the existing N5 west of Bellavary with offline bypasses of both Bellavary and Bohola. A preferred route corridor has been selected.

Route through Longford and Roscommon

The N5 leaves the N4 on the northwest side of Longford. The first  of the route follows a new bypass road that was completed in August 2012. The road passes by Scramoge along a realignment (opened in May 2004) on the way to Strokestown. West of Strokestown, at Tulsk, the N61 crosses the N5. The route continues northwest and passes north of Ballaghaderreen (alignment opened in 2014) before crossing into Co Mayo.

Route through Mayo

The N5 continues west bypassing Carracastle and Charlestown (bypass opened 2007). The N17 crosses the route near Charlestown. The N26 joins the N5 at Cloonlara just east of Swinford (bypassed to the south by the N5 Swinford Bypass). The N5 runs west/southwest through Bohola to Bellavary, where it meets the N58. The N5 continues west towards Castlebar, where it bypasses the town on the southeastern side. West/southwest of Castlebar, the road enters Westport along Castlebar Street, Bridge Street and Shop Street (the N5 also runs via James Street and North Mall). At The Octagon in Westport town centre, the N5 meets the N59. The N5 is County Mayo's busiest road with traffic counts of almost 18,000 on the Castlebar relief road. The section between Westport and Castlebar sees over 10,000 vehicles daily, while the section with the lowest volumes is the Charlestown bypass with no more than 7,000 vehicles.

Confusion over termination point
Under the Local Government (Roads and Motorways) Act (Declaration of National Roads) Order 1977 - which defined the original national primary and secondary routes – the N5's terminus was set at Castlebar. The section of road between Castlebar and Westport was designated part of the N60, a national secondary route. Outdated road signage (which should have been replaced by the local authority or at least corrected) in Castlebar also indicates that the N5 commences on the Castlebar inner relief road at the Westport Road roundabout.

However the road between Westport and Castlebar was upgraded to national primary route status in 1994 (under the Roads Act, 1993 (Declaration of National Roads) Order, 1994) and became part of the N5 road. Road signage on this route reflects this. The route no longer runs through Castlebar town centre in any case, having been bypassed by a relief road. Road signage on the N4 in Dublin was mostly patched to reflect the new destination only in the early 2000s but some signs reading Castlebar still remain elsewhere.

See also
Roads in Ireland
Motorways in Ireland
National secondary road
Regional road

References

05
Roads in County Longford
Roads in County Roscommon
Roads in County Mayo